
Gmina Stary Zamość is a rural gmina (administrative district) in Zamość County, Lublin Voivodeship, in eastern Poland.

The gmina contains part of the protected area called Skierbieszów Landscape Park.

Villages
Gmina Stary Zamość contains the villages and settlements of Bezednia, Borowina, Chomęciska Duże, Chomęciska Duże-Kolonia, Chomęciska Małe, Doły, Koniec, Krasne, Majdan Sitaniecki, Nowa Wieś, Podkrasne, Podstary Zamość, Stary Zamość, Udrycze, Udrycze-Kolonia and Wisłowiec.

Neighbouring gminas
Gmina Stary Zamość is bordered by the gminas of Izbica, Nielisz, Skierbieszów and Zamość.

References

Polish official population figures 2006

Stary Zamosc
Zamość County